Emile Kuri (June 11, 1907 – October 10, 2000) was a Mexican-born American set decorator of Lebanese parentage. He won two Academy Awards and was nominated for six more in the category Best Art Direction. He was born in Cuernavaca, Morelos, Mexico, and died in Los Angeles, California, United States.

Selected filmography
Kuri won two Academy Awards for Best Art Direction and was nominated for six more:

Won
 The Heiress (1949)
 20,000 Leagues Under the Sea (1954)

Nominated
 Silver Queen (1942)
 Carrie (1952)
 Executive Suite (1954)
 The Absent-Minded Professor (1961)
 Mary Poppins (1964)
 Bedknobs and Broomsticks (1971)

Other films
 It's A Wonderful Life (1946)
 Rope (1948)

References

External links

1907 births
2000 deaths
American set decorators
Best Art Direction Academy Award winners
People from Cuernavaca
American people of Lebanese descent
Mexican emigrants to the United States